Rhythm 93.7 FM is a commercial radio station located in the Old GRA neighborhood of Port Harcourt, Rivers State. The station broadcasts an urban contemporary radio format, playing a variety of music genres including R&B, hip hop, with occasional electronic dance music and reggae. It is owned and operated by Silverbird Communications under the Silverbird Group company and is one of the most popular private radio stations in the south of Nigeria.

Line Up

Staff

Disc Jockeys
DJ Best
DJ Spin
DJ DoubleD
DJ Golden
Dj Tan

Presenters
Azubuike Wokocha
Stephanie Obuzo
Chikodi Nwosu
Charlse Baridam
Ben Wakama

Notable former on-air staff
Andre Blaze, currently works at The Virtuoso Company
Ifeoma Iphie Aggrey-Fynn (died 2015)
Cleopatra Tawo, now with Planet FM 101.1 in Uyo

Incidents

Legal issues
On 19 December 2005, two of the station's radio hosts Klem Ofuokwu and Cleopatra Tawo were arrested and charged with giving false news report of a Bridge Failure. They were detained for two weeks and then released on bail.

See also

Music of Port Harcourt
List of radio stations in Port Harcourt

References

External links

Rhythm 93.7 web

Radio stations established in 2002
Radio stations in Port Harcourt
Privately held companies of Nigeria
Companies based in Port Harcourt
Urban contemporary radio stations
Hip hop radio stations
Old GRA, Port Harcourt
2002 establishments in Nigeria
2000s establishments in Rivers State
Silverbird Communications radio stations